The 1995 Norwegian Football Cup was the 90th edition of the Norwegian Football Cup. The 1995 Norwegian Football Cup was won by Rosenborg after they defeated Brann in the cup final. It took a replay to decide the winner.

Calendar
Below are the dates for each round as given by the official schedule:

First round 

|colspan="3" style="background-color:#97DEFF"|9 May 1995

|-
|colspan="3" style="background-color:#97DEFF"|10 May 1995

|}

Second round 

|colspan="3" style="background-color:#97DEFF"|30 May 1995

|-
|colspan="3" style="background-color:#97DEFF"|31 May 1995

|-
|colspan="3" style="background-color:#97DEFF"|8 June 1995

|}

Third round 

|colspan="3" style="background-color:#97DEFF"|21 June 1995

|}

Fourth round

|colspan="3" style="background-color:#97DEFF"|27 July 1995

|-
|colspan="3" style="background-color:#97DEFF"|Replay: 2 August 1995

|-
|colspan="3" style="background-color:#97DEFF"|Replay: 9 August 1995

|}

Quarter-finals

Semi-finals

First leg

Second leg 

Brann won 5–4 on aggregate.

Rosenborg won 7–1 on aggregate.

Final

First match

Replay match

References
http://www.rsssf.no

Norwegian Football Cup seasons
Norway
Football Cup